The Island of Dr. Trombone is a 2000 jazz album by trombonist Harry Watters.  Regarding the tropical feel of the album, Watters said that “recording the disc was a therapeutic way of getting through the harshest weeks of sub-freezing temperatures.”  The album features several of Watters’ own compositions as well as those by other artists.

Production
The album was recorded in Decatur, Alabama.

Critical reception
Cadence deemed the album "light jazz ... as innocuous as a summer zephyr." AllMusic called the album "a minor classic, an affirmation of the vitality of the jazz trombone, and an entertainingly joyful noise."

Personnel
Harry Watters - trombone
Ken Watters - trumpet
Andy Narell - steelpans
Claire Watters - piccolo
Steve Fidyk - drums
Alan Wonneberger - recording, audio mixing

Track listing
 "The Island of Dr. Trombone" (Harry Watters) – 3:56
 "Cherry Pink & Apple Blossom White" (Louis Gugliemi) – 4:33
 "The Trainer on the Beach" (Harry Watters) – 4:39
 "Theme from ‘I Dream of Jeannie’" (Hugo Montenegro) – 3:56
 "You Are the Sunshine of My Life" (Stevie Wonder) – 3:57
 "Fiesta Bay" (Harry Watters) – 3:33
 "Here Comes the Sun" (George Harrison) – 3:49
 "S.C. Is Hittin' the Beach" (Santa Claus Is Coming to Town) (Haven Gillespie/J. Fred Coots) – 5:07
 "Trinidad" (Harry Watters) – 5:22
 "Yesterday" (Lennon–McCartney) – 3:26

References

External links
 audio samples

2000 albums
Harry Watters albums